William Dickson (born 8 April 1945 in Larkhall) is a Scottish former footballer, who played most notably for Kilmarnock and Scotland.

He played for Kilmarnock for approximately a decade, winning international honours in 1970 and 1971. After a season with Motherwell, he became a coach at Ayr United. He briefly resumed his playing career with Hamilton.

References

External links

1945 births
Living people
Sportspeople from Larkhall
Scottish Football League players
Scotland international footballers
Scottish footballers
Kilmarnock F.C. players
Motherwell F.C. players
Hamilton Academical F.C. players
Ayr United F.C. non-playing staff
Scottish Football League representative players
Association football fullbacks
Footballers from South Lanarkshire
Scotland under-23 international footballers